Racism in Poland in the 20th and 21st centuries has been the subject of significant inquiry. While ethnic minorities made up a more significant proportion of the country's population from the founding of the Polish state through the Second Polish Republic, 21st century government statistics have shown 94% or more of the population self-reports as ethnically Polish.

Starting with the 16th century, many Jews lived in Poland, so much that it was called the center of the Jewish world. Occasional pogroms, such as in Krakow in 1494 and Warsaw in 1527, punctuated a time period of material prosperity and relative security of Polish Jews. 30,000 Jews were killed in the Cossack Chmielnicki Uprising in Ukraine. After the second partition of Poland, Frederick the Great, considering the territory a new colony and its people like the Iroquois of North America, began a Prussian colonisation campaign which sought to replace the Polish language and culture with German.

During World War II, Poland was the main scene of the Holocaust, the Porajmos, and the Nazi atrocities against the Polish nation. These genocides varied in how, when and where they were applied; Jews and Romani were targeted for immediate extermination and suffered the greatest casualties, while the Poles were targeted for destruction and enslavement within 15–20 years. Robert Gellately has called the Nazi racial policy of cultural eradication and mass extermination of people based on ethnicity a serial genocide, since in its broader formulation it targeted multiple ethnic groups who the Nazis deemed "sub-human", including Ukrainians, Belarusians, Poles and Jews.

Jewish people

King Casimir III the Great brought Jews to Poland during the Black Death at a time when Jewish communities were being persecuted and expelled from all over Europe. As a result of better living conditions, 80% of the world's Jews lived in Poland by the mid-16th century.

During the 15th century in the royal capital of Kraków, extremist clergymen advocated violence against the Jews, who gradually lost their positions. In 1469, Jews were expelled from their old settlement and forced to move to Spiglarska Street. In 1485, Jewish elders were forced to renounce trade in Kraków, leading many Jews to leave for Kazimierz which did not fall under the restrictions due to its status as a royal town. Following the 1494 fire in Kraków, a wave of anti-Jewish attacks occurred. King John I Albert forced the remaining Jews of Kraków to move to Kazimierz. Starting in 1527, Jews were no longer admitted into the city walls of Warsaw (generally speaking, temporary stays were possible in the royal palace). Only the Praga suburb was open to them.

The Council of Four Lands created in 1581 was a Jewish diet presided over by community elders from each major part of Poland, another governing body was established in Lithuania in 1623. Jewish communities were usually protected by the szlachta (nobles) in exchange for their work administering the nobles' domains. As such, they were often on the front line in revolts against the lords of the land, as was the case during the Cossack revolts in 1630, 1637 and 1639. It is estimated, in particular, that 30,000 Jews perished from 1648 to 1649 as a result of the Chmielnicki Uprising.

In Congress Poland, Jews gained civic rights with the ukase (edict) of 5 June 1862, two years before serfdom was abolished and the peasantry was freed. 35 years later, in 1897, the 1.4 million Jews represented 14% of the population of the Russian-administered partition, which included Warsaw and Lodz.

In the Second Polish Republic, from the 1920s the Polish government excluded Jews from receiving government bank credits, from public sector employment (in 1931, only 599 of 87,640 public servants were Jewish—in the fields of telephony, railroads, administration and justice), and from obtaining business licenses in government-controlled spheres of the economy. From the 1930s, limits were placed on Jewish enrollment in universities, admission to the medical and legal professions, on Jewish shops, Jewish export firms, Shechita, membership in business associations, and more. While 25% of students were Jews in 1921-22, the proportion had dropped to 8% by 1938-9. The far-right National Democracy (Endeks) party organized anti-Jewish boycotts. Following the death of Poland's ruler Józef Piłsudski in 1935, the Endeks intensified its efforts and in 1937 declared that its "main aim and duty must be to remove the Jews from all spheres of social, economic, and cultural life in Poland", which lead to violence in a few cases (pogroms in smaller towns). In response, the government organized the Camp of National Unity (OZON), which took control of the Polish parliament in 1938. The Polish parliament then drafted anti-Jewish legislation similar to anti-Jewish laws which existed in Germany, Hungary, and Romania. OZON advocated the mass emigration of Jews from Poland, boycotts of Jews, numerus clausus (see also Ghetto benches), and other limitations on Jewish rights. According to Timothy Snyder, in the years leading up to World War II the Polish leadership "wanted to be rid of most Polish Jews... [but] in simple logistical terms the idea... seemed to make no sense. How could Poland arrange a deportation of millions of Jews while the country was mobilized for war? Should the tens of thousands of Jewish officers and soldiers be pulled from the ranks of the Polish army?"

In the mid-20th century, notable incidents of antisemitism in Poland included the Jedwabne pogrom of 1941 in the presence of German Ordnungspolizei (police officers) and Anti-Jewish violence in Poland, 1944–46, attributed to postwar lawlessness as well as an anti-communist insurrection against the new pro-Soviet government immediately after the end of World War II in Europe, and the "Żydokomuna" (Jewish communism) stereotype. Another major event took place during the 1968 Polish political crisis.

The Jewish community in Poland made up about 10% of the country's total population in 1939 but it was all but eradicated during the Holocaust. In the Polish census of 2011, only 7,353 people declared either their primary or secondary ethnicity as Jewish.

In 2017, the University of Warsaw's Center for Research on Prejudice found an increase in antisemitic views in Poland, possibly due to growing anti-migrant sentiment and Islamophobia in Poland. Later that year, the European Jewish Congress accused the Polish government of "normalizing" the phenomenon in the country.

Despite Poland's current scant Jewish population, antisemitism persists and fulfills various important roles in Polish society. It is an informal tenet of Polish religiosity, enables Poles to view themselves as the main victims of the Nazis, enables them to deny their historic responsibility for anti-Jewish crimes, and provides a scapegoat for problems in the post-communist transition. Unlike other European societies, contemporary Polish antisemitism is not related to attitudes towards Israel. Furthermore, the political representation of those employing antisemitic rhetoric is very limited. One contemporary motif claimed to be antisemitic is the Jew with a coin picture, displayed in 18% of Polish homes to bring luck.

Roma
In June 1991, the Mława riot, a series of violent incidents against Polska Roma, broke out after a Romani teenager drove into three ethnic Poles in a crosswalk, killing one Polish man and permanently injuring another, before fleeing the scene of the accident. After the accident, a rioting mob attacked wealthy Romani settlements in the Polish town of Mława. Both the Mława police chief and University of Warsaw sociology researchers said that the pogrom was primarily due to class envy (some Romani have grown wealthy in the gold and automobile trades). At the time, the mayor of the town, as well as the Romani involved and other residents, said the incident was primarily racially motivated.

During coverage of the riot, an emerging change in ethnic stereotypes about Roma in Poland was identified. Roma were no longer poor, dirty, or cheerful, and did not beg or pretend to be lowly anymore. Instead, they were seen as owning high-end cars, living in fancy mansions, flaunting their wealth while bragging that local authorities and police are on their payroll, leaving them unafraid of anyone. At the same time, they were seen as swindlers, thieves, hustlers, and military service dodgers who refused to hold down legal, decent jobs. Negative "metastereotypes" – or the Romas' own perceptions of stereotypes that dominant groups hold about their group – were described by the Polish Roma Society in an attempt to heighten the awareness of and dialogue around exclusionism.

Ukrainians
During the second half of the last millennium, Poland experienced significant periods when its feudal economy was dominated by serfdom. Many serfs were treated in disdainful fashion by the nobility (szlachta) and had few rights. While many serfs were ethnic, Catholic Poles, many others were Orthodox Ruthenians, later self-identifying as Ukrainians and Belarusians. Some scholars described the attitudes of the (mostly Polish) nobility towards serfs as a form of racism. In modern Poland, where Ukrainians form a significant minority of migrant workers, they are subject to occasional racism in everyday life.

Sub-Saharan Africans
The most common word in Polish for a black person has traditionally been "Murzyn". It is often regarded as a neutral word to describe a person of black (Sub-Saharan African) ancestry, but nowadays many consider it pejorative, with dictionaries reflecting this. Professor Marek Łaziński has said that "Murzyn" is now "archaic".

Perceptions of black people have also been shaped by literature. Henryk Sienkiewicz’s novel In Desert and Wilderness contains the famous character Kali, who speaks broken English and has dubious morality. In 1924, poet Julian Tuwim published a children's verse, "Murzynek Bambo" ("The little Murzyn Bambo"), which remained much-loved over the following half-century, but in the 21st century became criticised for "othering" black people. In Communist Poland, Uncle Tom’s Cabin, by Harriet Beecher Stowe was translated quite freely and targeted at children because it was seen as anti-capitalist and anti-slavery, but now is seen as reinforcing various black stereotypes.

One high-profile event with regard to blacks in Poland was the death of Maxwell Itoya in 2010, a Nigerian street vendor from a mixed marriage who was selling counterfeit goods. He was shot in the upper leg by a police officer during a street brawl that followed a screening check at a market in Warsaw, and died of a severed artery. The event led to a media debate regarding policing and racism.

In Strzelce Opolskie, black football players from the LZS Piotrówka club were attacked in a bar by fans of opposing team Odra Opole in 2015 and two young men were arrested. At least six were sentenced. In a Łódź dance club, a black student was attacked in a men's washroom.

Ethnic Poles
Through Poles have generally constituted a majority of Poland's population, there were times, particularly during the partitions of Poland (mid-18th century to 1918), when most Polish territories were under control of other nations, and Poles, effectively minorities in nationalistic German Empire and Russian Empire, were subject to discrimination and racism.

German Empire
Racist publications about Poles appeared as early as the 18th century and were imbued with Medieval ethnic stereotypes and racist overtones in order to justify German rule over Polish territories. Authors such as Georg Forster wrote that Poles were "cattle in human form".

When part of Poland was under the rule of the German Empire, the Polish population was discriminated against by racist policies. These policies gained popularity among German nationalists, some of whom were members of the Völkisch movement, leading to the expulsion of Poles by Germany. This was fueled by Anti-Polish sentiment, especially during the age of partitions in the 18th century. The Kulturkampf campaign led by Otto von Bismarck resulted in a legacy of anti-Polish racism; the Polish population experienced oppression and exploitation at the hands of Germans. The racist ideas of the Prussian state directed against Polish people were adopted by German social scientists, led in part by Max Weber.

Nazi Germany

During World War II Poland was occupied by Nazi Germany and the Soviet Union and Polish people were harshly discriminated against in their own country. In directive No. 1306, issued by Reich Ministry of Public Enlightenment and Propaganda on 24 October 1939, the concept of untermenschen (subhuman) is cited in reference to Polish ethnicity and culture: 

Most Nazis considered the Poles, like the majority of other Slavs, to be non-Aryan and non-European "masses from the East" which should be either totally annihilated along with the Jews and Gypsies, or entirely expelled from the European continent. Poles were the victims of Nazi crimes against humanity and some of the main non-Jewish victims of the Holocaust. Approximately 2.7 million ethnic Poles were murdered or killed during World War II.

Nazi policy towards ethnically Polish people eventually became the genocide and destruction of the entire Polish nation, as well as cultural genocide which involved Germanisation and the suppression or murder of the religious, cultural, intellectual, and political leadership.

On March 15, 1940, Heinrich Himmler stated that "All Polish specialists will be exploited in our military-industrial complex. Later, all Poles will disappear from this world. It is imperative that the great German nation considers the elimination of all Polish people as its chief task." The goal of the policy was to prevent effective Polish resistance and to exploit Polish people as slave laborers, foreseeing the extermination of Poles as a nation. Polish slaves in Nazi Germany were forced to wear identifying red tags with the letter P sewn to their clothing. Sexual relations with Germans (rassenschande or "racial defilement") were punishable by death. During the war, many Polish men were executed for their relations with German women.

In 1942, racial discrimination became Nazi policy with the Decree on Penal Law for Poles and Jews.

During the post-war Trials of Nazis it was stated during Trial of Ulrich Freifelt that:

Likewise, during World War II around 120,000 Polish people, mostly women and children, became the primary victims of ethnic cleansing by the Ukrainian Insurgent Army, which was then operating in the territory of occupied Poland.

Studies and surveys

2008 EVS survey
An analysis based on the European Values Survey (EVS), which took place in 2008, compares Poland to other European nations. Poland had very high levels of political tolerance (lack of extremist political attitudes), relatively high levels of ethnic tolerance (based on attitudes towards Muslims, immigrants, Romas, and Jews) and at the same time low levels of personal tolerance (based on attitudes towards people considered "deviant" or "threatening"). From 1998 to 2008, there was a marked increase in political and ethnic tolerance, but a decrease in personal tolerance.

In 1990, due partly to the political euphoria accompanying the fall of communism, Poland was the most tolerant nation in Central Europe. However, over the course of the '90s, the level of tolerance decreased. By 1999, EVS recorded Poland as having one of the highest rates of xenophobia in Europe, while antisemitism also increased during this time. The factors behind these decreases in tolerance and the radicalization in attitudes towards other ethnic groups during this time likely included the country's economic problems associated with a costly transition from Communism (for example, high unemployment), ineffectual government and possibly an increase in immigration from outside.

These attitudes began to change after 2000, possibly due to Poland's entry into the European Union, increased travel abroad and more frequent encounters with people of other races. By 2008, the EVS showed Poland as one of the least xenophobic countries in Central and Eastern Europe. The negative attitudes towards Jews have likewise returned to their lower 1990s level, although they do remain somewhat above the European average. During the same time period, ethnic tolerance and political tolerance increased in Southern Europe (Spain, Greece) and decreased in other parts of Northern Europe (Netherlands).

While the Roma group was listed as the most rejected, the level of exclusion was still lower than elsewhere in Europe, most likely due to the long history of Roma (see Polska Roma) and their relatively low numbers in the country.

2012 CRP survey
In a 2012 survey conducted by the Center for Research on Prejudice at the University of Warsaw, it was found that 78.5% of participants disagreed with traditional antisemitic statements (e.g. "Jews are responsible for the death of Jesus Christ"), but 52.9% agreed with secondary antisemitic statements (e.g. "Jews spread the stereotype of Polish anti-Semitism"), and 64.6% believed in a "Jewish conspiracy" (e.g. "Jews would like to rule the world"). The authors noted that "belief in [a] Jewish conspiracy proved to be the strongest significant predictor of discriminatory intentions towards Jews in all fields. Traditional anti-Semitism predicted social distance towards Jews, while it did not predict any of the other discriminatory intentions. Secondary anti-Semitism failed to predict any form of discriminatory intentions against Jews."

2014 ADL Global 100 survey
In the ADL Global 100 survey conducted in 2013–2014, 57% of respondents said that "it is probably true" that "Jews have too much power in the business world"; 55% that "Jews have too much power in international financial markets"; 42% that "Jews have too much control over global affairs"; and 33% that "people hate Jews because of the way Jews behave".

2018 FRA survey
In the FRA 2018 Experiences and perceptions of antisemitism/Second survey on discrimination and hate crime against Jews in the EU, antisemitism in Poland was identified as a "fairly big" or "very big" problem by 85% of respondents (placing Poland at the fourth place after France, Germany and Belgium); 61% reported that antisemitism had increased "a lot" in the past five years (second place after France, and before Belgium and Germany); 74% reported that intolerance towards Muslims had increased "a lot" (second place after Hungary, and before Austria and the UK); and 89% reported an increase in expressions of antisemitism online (second place after France, and before Italy and Belgium). The most commonly heard antisemitic statements were "Jews have too much power in Poland" (70%) and "Jews exploit Holocaust victimhood for their own purposes" (67%).

Countering racism

Government action
In 2004, the government took some initiatives in order to tackle the problem of racism. It adopted the "National Programme to Prevent Racial Discrimination, Xenophobia and Related Intolerance 2004-2009" ("Krajowy Program Przeciwdziałania Dyskryminacji Rasowej, Ksenofobii i Związanej z Nimi Nietolerancji 2004 – 2009") and also established the Monitoring Team on Racism and Xenophobia within the Ministry of Interior and Administration. The Implementation Report (2010) stated that the programme suffered from various obstacles, including lacking and unclear funding, and eventually some planned tasks were completed, while others were not.

In 2013 Polish Prime Minister Donald Tusk started The Council Against Racial Discrimination and Xenophobia, but it was shut down by the new Law and Justice government in May 2016.

See also
 Hate speech laws in Poland
 Islamophobia in Poland

References

Further reading
 
 

 
Poland